Taqiabad (also Romanized as Taqīābād) is a village in Golzar Rural District, in the Central District of Bardsir County, Kerman Province, Iran. At the 2006 census, its population was 45, in 12 families.

References 

Populated places in Bardsir County